Mastax florida is a species of beetle in the family Carabidae with restricted distribution in the India.

References

Mastax florida
Beetles described in 1924
Beetles of Asia